Nepenthes graciliflora is a tropical pitcher plant endemic to the Philippines. Long considered a synonym of N. alata, it was restored as a separate species in 2013 by Martin Cheek and Matthew Jebb. It has been recorded from the islands of Bohol, Leyte, Luzon, Mindanao, Mindoro, Panay, Samar, and Sibuyan, and following the redelimitation of N. alata is the most widespread Nepenthes species of the Philippines. It is known from mossy, submontane forest, generally at  altitude, though the type specimen from Sibuyan was collected at only .

Nepenthes graciliflora belongs to the informal "N. alata group", which also includes N. alata, N. ceciliae, N. copelandii, N. extincta, N. hamiguitanensis, N. kitanglad, N. kurata, N. leyte, N. mindanaoensis, N. negros, N. ramos, N. saranganiensis, and N. ultra. These species are united by a number of morphological characters, including winged petioles, lids with basal ridges on the lower surface (often elaborated into appendages), and upper pitchers that are usually broadest near the base.

References

 Mey, F.S. 2013. The Nepenthes alata group: resurrection of N. graciliflora ; N. ramos and N. negros described as new species. Strange Fruits: A Garden's Chronicle, August 27, 2013.
  Micheler, M., T. Gronemeyer, A. Wistuba, D. Marwinski, W. Suarez & V. Amoroso 2013. Nepenthes viridis, eine neue Nepenthes-Art von der Insel Dinagat, Philippinen. Das Taublatt 76: 4–21.

Carnivorous plants of Asia
graciliflora
Plants described in 1912
Endemic flora of the Philippines